Confusions of a Nutzy Spy is a 1943 Warner Bros. Looney Tunes cartoon directed by Norman McCabe. The short was released on January 23, 1943, and stars Porky Pig.

The cartoon is a World War II propaganda film that deals with Porky and his bloodhound that has sneezing problems trying to track down a Nazi spy caricature in the form of a lynx. Their goal is to stop him from blowing up a critical railroad bridge.

The title is a pun of the film title Confessions of a Nazi Spy. The lynx is called the "Missing Lynx", a pun on the description missing link.  The bomb is called "Hallelujah, I'm a Bomb", a reference to the song "Hallelujah, I'm a Bum".

Plot
The cartoon opens by panning past a number of signs in "Ye Towne Cooler" that make fun of small town prisons and various criminal practices. Eggbert, a bloodhound, is asleep. A nearby radio alarm clock goes off and wakes him up. The broadcast annoys him so much that he breaks the radio with a mallet. Porky enters with a wanted poster, and Eggbert is about to hit Porky with the mallet, until Porky says they need to catch a spy. Eggbert sneezes forcefully enough that Porky is blown clear out of the town jail. The wanted poster lands on the spy's face.

Eggbert has trouble finding the spy (presumably due to his nasal congestion). When he and Porky do catch up to the spy, the spy tries to fool Porky with disguises. Eggbert sneezes again, which blows both him and Porky away from the spy.

The spy sets a bomb to blow up a railroad bridge. When the bomb's timer only has one minute left on it, he reveals his plan to Porky before he notices that Eggbert has retrieved the bomb and placed it at his feet. The spy throws the bomb away, but Eggbert retrieves it again (and again).

The spy, Porky, Eggbert, and the bomb all end up in a cave together. Eggbert sneezes yet again, everyone gets blown away, and the spy and the bomb land next to each other as time runs out. Nothing happens, so the spy thinks the bomb is a dud and becomes upset. He slams it on the ground and it blows up. The spy flies up into the clouds, where he jumps around, celebrating the fact that the bomb worked after all. He gives the Nazi salute and falls backward, his feet forming the V sign.

References

External links
 

1943 films
1943 animated films
1943 short films
1940s American animated films
1940s animated short films
American spy comedy films
Looney Tunes shorts
Films about Nazis
American black-and-white films
1940s spy comedy films
World War II spy films
American World War II propaganda shorts
Films directed by Norman McCabe
Films scored by Carl Stalling
Porky Pig films
Films produced by Leon Schlesinger
1940s war comedy films
1943 comedy films